The following is a list of songs written about Bareilly, also known as "Bareli", a city in Uttar Pradesh of India: 
"Jhumka Geera Re" - a 1966 song from Mera Saaya sung by Asha Bhosle mentions "Bareilly Ke Bazaar Mein" in the second verse.
"Bareilly Ke Bazaar Mein" - a song by Sonu Kakkar
"Bareilly wale jhumke pe jiya lalchaye"
"kajra Mohabbat wala"- film Kismat
"Aaja Nach le"- song by Sunidhi Chauhan from Aaja Nachle

References

Bareilly
Culture of Uttar Pradesh
Songs about India
Bareilly-related lists